Events from the year 1953 in Canada.

Incumbents

Crown 
 Monarch – Elizabeth II

Federal government 
 Governor General – Vincent Massey
 Prime Minister – Louis St. Laurent
 Chief Justice – Thibaudeau Rinfret (Quebec) 
 Parliament – 21st (until 13 June) then 22nd (from 12 November)

Provincial governments

Lieutenant governors 
Lieutenant Governor of Alberta – John J. Bowlen   
Lieutenant Governor of British Columbia – Clarence Wallace 
Lieutenant Governor of Manitoba – Roland Fairbairn McWilliams (until August 1) then John Stewart McDiarmid 
Lieutenant Governor of New Brunswick – David Laurence MacLaren 
Lieutenant Governor of Newfoundland – Leonard Outerbridge 
Lieutenant Governor of Nova Scotia – Alistair Fraser 
Lieutenant Governor of Ontario – Louis Orville Breithaupt 
Lieutenant Governor of Prince Edward Island – Thomas William Lemuel Prowse 
Lieutenant Governor of Quebec – Gaspard Fauteux  
Lieutenant Governor of Saskatchewan – William John Patterson

Premiers 
Premier of Alberta – Ernest Manning   
Premier of British Columbia – W.A.C. Bennett 
Premier of Manitoba – Douglas Campbell 
Premier of New Brunswick – Hugh John Flemming  
Premier of Newfoundland – Joey Smallwood 
Premier of Nova Scotia – Angus Macdonald 
Premier of Ontario – Leslie Frost 
Premier of Prince Edward Island – J. Walter Jones (until May 25) then Alex Matheson 
Premier of Quebec – Maurice Duplessis 
Premier of Saskatchewan – Tommy Douglas

Territorial governments

Commissioners 
 Commissioner of Yukon – Wilfred George Brown 
 Commissioner of Northwest Territories – Hugh Andrew Young (until November 15) then Robert Gordon Robertson

Events
January 1 – The National Library of Canada is founded.
January 9 – Marguerite Pitre becomes the thirteenth, and last, woman hanged in Canada when she is executed in Montréal.
January 27 – The Canadian Dental Association approves the use of fluoride in drinking water
May 25 – Alex Matheson becomes premier of Prince Edward Island, replacing J. Walter Jones
June 2 – Elizabeth II is crowned Queen of Canada. In Korea the Canadian Army celebrates the coronation by firing red, white, and blue smoke shells at the enemy.
July 13 – The Stratford Festival of Canada opens
July 27 – The Korean War ends. In total 314 Canadians were killed and 1211 wounded.
August 10 – Federal election: Louis Saint Laurent's Liberals win a fifth consecutive majority.
October 12 – Wilfrid Laurier Memorial unveiled
October 15 – The Trans Mountain Oil Pipeline is completed
October 25 – Canada's first privately owned television station, CKSO, broadcasts in Sudbury.
The federal Immigration Act is amended to prohibit homosexuals entry into Canada. This amendment was repealed in 1977.

Arts and literature

Awards
See 1953 Governor General's Awards for a complete list of winners and finalists for those awards.
Stephen Leacock Award: Lawrence Earl,  The Battle of Baltinglass

Sport  
April 16 - Montreal Canadiens won their Seventh Stanley Cup by defeating the Boston Bruins 4 games to 1. The deciding Game 5 was played at the Montreal Forum
May 6 - Ontario Hockey Association's Barrie Flyers won their Second Memorial Cup by defeating the Manitoba Junior Hockey League's St. Boniface Canadiens 4 games to 1. The deciding Game 5 was played at Wheat City Arena in Brandon, Manitoba
November 28 - Hamilton Tiger-Cats won their First Grey Cup by defeating the  Winnipeg Blue Bombers 12–6 in the 41st Grey Cup played at Toronto's Varsity Stadium

Births

January to June
January 7
 Dionne Brand, poet, novelist and non-fiction writer
Morris Titanic, ice hockey player and coach
January 19 – Richard Legendre, tennis player and politician
January 29 – Pierre Jacob, politician
February 5 – Eric Robinson, politician
February 15
 David Chomiak, politician
 Gerald Keddy, politician
February 16 – Lanny McDonald, ice hockey player
February 17 – Borys Chambul, discus thrower
February 18 – Robbie Bachman, drummer (d. 2023)
February 20 – Gaëtan Dugas, early AIDS patient, the alleged and debunked Patient Zero for AIDS (d.1984)
March 10 – Debbie Brill, high jumper
March 13 – Stephanie Berto, track and field athlete
April 2 – Janet Nutter, diver
April 17 – Dany Laferrière, novelist and journalist
April 18 – Rick Moranis, comedian, actor and musician
May 11 – Celine Lomez, actress and singer
May 14 – Tom Cochrane, singer-songwriter and musician
May 21 - Kathleen Wynne, 25th premier of Ontario
June 23 – Raymonde April, photographer
June 23 – Albina Guarnieri, politician and Minister

July to September

July 3 – Dave Lewis, ice hockey player and coach
July 9 – Margie Gillis, dancer and choreographer
July 15 – Richard Margison, operatic tenor
July 15 – Mila Mulroney, wife of the 18th Prime Minister of Canada, Brian Mulroney
July 22 – Paul Quarrington, novelist, playwright, screenwriter, filmmaker and musician
July 25 – Barbara Haworth-Attard, children's author
July 29 – Geddy Lee, singer, bassist and keyboardist
August 11 – Greg Duhaime, middle-distance runner
August 17 – Robert Thirsk, engineer and astronaut
August 27 – Alex Lifeson, guitarist
September 16 – Nancy Huston, novelist and essayist
September 29 - Jean-Claude Lauzon, Quebec filmmaker (d. 1997)
September 30 – S. M. Stirling, science fiction and fantasy author

October to December
October 12 – Daniel Louis, film producer
October 24
 Charles Colbourn, computer scientist and mathematician
 Jim Pettie, ice hockey player (d.2019)
October 29 – Denis Potvin, ice hockey player
November 26 – Pam Barrett, politician (d.2008)
November 28 – John Majhor, radio and television host (d.2007)
December 7 – Carmen Rinke, boxer
December 13 – Bob Gainey, ice hockey player and coach
December 18 – Daniel Poliquin, novelist and translator
December 23 – Holly Dale, film and television director and film producer

Full date unknown
 Patrick LaForge, president and CEO of the Edmonton Oilers

Deaths

January 2 – Gordon Daniel Conant, lawyer, politician and 12th Premier of Ontario (b.1885)
January 5 – Mitchell Hepburn, politician and 11th Premier of Ontario (b.1896)
February 16 – Norman Hipel, politician and Minister (b.1890)
March 20 – John Livingstone Brown, politician (b.1867)

May 4 – James Tompkins, priest and educator (b.1870)
September 19 – Gordon Graydon, politician (b.1897)
November 29 – Sam De Grasse, actor (b.1875)
December 26 – David Milne, painter, printmaker and writer (b.1882)

See also
 List of Canadian films

References

 
Years of the 20th century in Canada
Canada
1953 in North America